Crusher is a  autonomous off-road Unmanned Ground Combat Vehicle developed by researchers at the Carnegie Mellon University's National Robotics Engineering Center for DARPA. It is a follow up on the previous Spinner vehicle. DARPA's technical name for the Crusher is Unmanned Ground Combat Vehicle and Perceptor Integration System, and the whole project is known by the acronym UPI, which stands for Unmanned Ground Combat Vehicle PerceptOR Integration.

Capabilities 
The Crusher can carry  of combined armor and cargo. According to Stephen Welby, director of DARPA's Tactical Technology Office, "This vehicle can go into places where, if you were following in a Humvee, you'd come out with spinal injuries." The Crusher can climb up slopes of more than 40 degrees and travel with more than 30 degrees of slope to the side.

Construction 
These robots have space frames (made of aluminum and titanium) and skid plates to protect the robot from heavy blows from objects like boulders. The Crusher also has a hybrid engine capable of travelling several miles on one battery charge. The diesel engine then turns on to continue powering the Crusher and to recharge the battery module. This diesel engine comes from a diesel Volkswagen Jetta.

Controls 
The Crusher has no driving controls because it is autonomous. Instead, the operators drive the Crusher with video game controllers. While driving between its waypoints via GPS, the Crusher continuously attempts to find the fastest and easiest path to its destination.

The camera system uses five 1.9 megapixel color cameras, which give an overall field of view of 200 degrees horizontally and 30 degrees vertically at a resolution of over four times that of a normal television set.

Purpose 
The Crusher could be used for a number of missions considered highly dangerous for soldiers, such as fire support, reconnaissance, or medevac; as a supply mule; or as a sentry. John Bares, one of the people on the development team for the Crusher, mentions that medevac would be a good use for the robot because it could go into the battlefield under fire to scoop up fallen soldiers. There are no plans to put the Crusher vehicle into service.  Instead, it will be used as the base for future unmanned vehicle designs.

See also 
Autonomous robot
List of military vehicles
Multifunctional Utility/Logistics and Equipment

References

External links 
Path sampling for the crusher
A brochure with pictures of the crusher

Unmanned ground combat vehicles
Carnegie Mellon University
DARPA
Proposed weapons
2006 robots
Robots of the United States
Six-wheeled robots